Teams from New Zealand, Fiji, New Caledonia and Tahiti played in the Oceania Football Confederation under-20 tournament in 2008.

Coach:  Stu Jacobs

Coach:  Carlos Buzzetti

Coach:  Didier Chambaron

Coach:  Lionel Charbonnier

2008